Christopher Calvin Harris (born 28 November 1982) from Truro, Cornwall, nicknamed Bomber, is a Great Britain international motorcycle speedway rider from England.

Career history

Early career 
Harris began his racing career at the age of six and a half by competing in grasstrack events. His talent quickly became apparent when he began to win all of the junior age groups in the South-West area. In 1998, aged 15, he turned to speedway racing for the St. Austell Gulls at Amateur Conference League level. The Gulls won the Championship and the Knockout Cup.

On his 16th birthday, Harris signed for the Exeter Falcons, who competed in the Premier League, the middle tier of British speedway's three-league structure. Despite the death of his father, who was his driver and mentor, he achieved his first notable individual success later that year, when he became Great Britain Under-16 Champion. He was also selected to ride for Great Britain at both Under-19 and Under-21 level.

In 2000, Harris more than doubled his previous year's points total, being unbeaten by an opponent in several matches. The Exeter Falcons team finished the season as Premier League Champions and reached two cup finals and one semi-final. Harris moved clubs for the 2001 season, joining the Trelawny Tigers in Cornwall. He soon became their top scorer and qualified for the 2001 Individual Speedway Junior World Championship as first reserve. He continued his form into 2002, being made club captain. Once again, he was top scorer for the club and under his captaincy Trelawny Tigers won the Premier Trophy.

Elite League progress and international debut 

Taking advantage of new rules introduced to assist young British riders, Harris also took the step up to ride in the Elite League in 2002, with the Peterborough Panthers. He progressed well during his debut Elite League season, moving up into the main body of the team. Individually, he progressed to the final of the British Speedway Championship and finished fourth in the World Under-21 Championship.

In 2003, Harris rode again for Trelawny Tigers in the Premier League and Peterborough Panthers in the Elite League. By the end of the season, he was an Elite League heat-leader. Off track, he was voted BBC South-West Sports Personality of the Year.

However, it was on the individual front Harris was most successful. In the World Under-21 Championship, he won both his quarter and semi final rounds, progressing to the 2003 Individual Speedway Junior World Championship in Sweden where he finished runner-up, one point behind Jarosław Hampel.

His form during 2003 won Harris an invitation to take part as a reserve in the third round of the 2003 FIM Individual Speedway World Championship, the British Grand Prix, held at Millennium Stadium in Cardiff.

2004 saw Harris sign for the Coventry Bees. The following season, the Bees won the Elite League Championship, which meant Harris had won titles at all three levels of British speedway aged just twenty-two. He also represented Great Britain in the Speedway World Cup. Harris continued to ride for Coventry until 2011.

International success
In 2007, Harris became British Champion. Harris was selected to ride as a permanent wild card in the 2007 Speedway Grand Prix series, riding at number 15. In only his fifth full Grand Prix meeting he won the British Grand Prix at Cardiff. He was also a victim of an armed robbery, just two weeks before his maiden Grand Prix win when he was held up at gunpoint whilst out with his manager. Winning the Grand Prix was considered to be the biggest event to happen in British Speedway for several years.

Off track, he was again voted BBC South-West Sports Personality of the Year. and was also voted BBC Midlands Sports Personality of the Year, beating Aston Villa footballer Gareth Barry into second place.

Harris won the British Championship twice more in 2009 and 2010 and for the first time since 2004, Harris would not ride for Coventry after he moved on loan to Belle Vue Aces for the 2011 Elite League speedway season. He continued to perform well in the 2011 World Championship including a 2nd place finish in the Croatian Grand Prix. After another season with Coventry in 2012, he would join Birmingham Brummies for the 2013 season. In 2014, he returned to Coventry until the end of the 2016 season.

Despite Harris finishing his Grand Prix appearances he continued to impress in Britain. He finished his Grand Prix career with a record of 103 meetings, nine finals, one win and 608 points. He also decided to compete in both divisions of the British league for the first time in 2017, riding for Rye House Rockets and Peterborough. He continued to ride in both divisions and made debuts for Glasgow Tigers, Poole Pirates and Ipswich Witches in 2018 and Somerset Rebels and Berwick Bandits in 2019.

In 2022, he rode for the Peterborough in the SGB Premiership 2022 and captained Berwick in the SGB Championship 2022. He was named rider of the year for Berwick. He also had a successful longtrack season winning a bronze medal at the 2022 Individual Long Track World Championship.

In 2023, he signed for Leicester Lions for the SGB Premiership 2023 and made a return to Glasgow for the SGB Championship 2023.

Speedway Grand Prix results

SGP Podium 
   Wrocław (12 May 2007) - 3rd place
  Cardiff (30 June 2007) - 1st place
  Copenhagen (5 June 2010) - 3rd place
  Gorican (28 August 2010) - 2nd place
  Terenzano (25 September 2010) - 2nd place
  Bydgoszcz (9 October 2010) - 2nd place
  Goričan (24 September 2011) - 2nd
  Warsaw (18 April 2015) - 2nd place

SGP Finals 
  Copenhagen (9 June 2012)

Other major results
Individual Speedway Long Track World Championship
 2017 - 5 apps (8th) 50pts
 2018 - 5 apps (8th) 52pts
 2019 - 5 apps (7th) 50pts
 2021 - 2 apps (4th) 23pts 
 2022 - 6 apps (3rd) 83pts 

Team Long Track World Championship
 2018 -  Morizes 16/46pts (with James Shanes, Zach Wajtknecht & Adam Ellis) Second
 2019 -  Vechta 14/41pts (with Zach Wajtknecht, Edward Kennett & Adam Ellis) Fourth

European Grasstrack Championship
 2016  Folkestone (11th) 8pts

See also 

 List of Speedway Grand Prix riders

References 

1982 births
Living people
British speedway riders
English motorcycle racers
Sportspeople from Truro
British Speedway Championship winners
Belle Vue Aces riders
Berwick Bandits riders
Coventry Bees riders
Exeter Falcons riders
Glasgow Tigers riders
Ipswich Witches riders
Leicester Lions riders
Peterborough Panthers riders
Poole Pirates riders
Rye House Rockets riders
St Austell Gulls riders
Somerset Rebels riders
Trelawny Tigers riders
Individual Speedway Long Track World Championship riders